Jung Ye-ji (정예지) is a South Korean actress and model. She is best known for supporting roles in various dramas. She has appeared in the school series Who Are You: School 2015 as Ye-ji and the movie Midnight Runners with a supporting role as a young police officer Dan-yeong.

Filmography

Film

Television

References

External links 
 

Year of birth unknown
Living people
21st-century South Korean actresses
South Korean female models
South Korean television actresses
South Korean film actresses
Year of birth missing (living people)